Batang X: The Next Generation is the TV spin-off of the movie, Batang X, about kids with super human abilities. The ultimate kid action hero show comes back! Back with a bigger production, back with the same talented minds and back with more renegade story. Batang X: The Next Generation is another Peque Gallaga masterpiece that follows the former maverick show, Batang X. Directed by Lore Reyes. With a fresh batch of talented child stars as super heroes and more modern extra-human powers, kids will now have a new trendy team to look up to.

Casts and Characters

Main cast
Alec Romano as Kid/lat/kid
Joshua Dionisio as G-Boy/Boy/Boy Gulang
Charles Justin Hilado as A-gel/ Angelo/arcangel
Angeli Gonzales as 3:NA/Trinity
Jeon Macatangay as Control
BJ Forbes as Obet
Ian Veneracion as Doc Kwago
Joyce Ching as Little Miss Mimi

Episode/Guest Cast/Supporting Cast
Elaver Pacatang as Sandy

See also
List of programs aired by The 5 Network

References

Philippine drama television series
TV5 (Philippine TV network) original programming
2008 Philippine television series debuts
2008 Philippine television series endings
Fantaserye and telefantasya
Filipino-language television shows